Trenton is a historic train station in Trenton, Florida. It was built in 1905 as a stop on the Atlantic Coast Line Railroad line from Newberry to Wilcox and on to Cross City.

In 1989, the Trenton Depot was listed in A Guide to Florida's Historic Architecture, published by the University of Florida Press.

In 2004, the Florida West Coast Railroad, which then operated the line through Trenton, was allowed to abandon all of its lines except for a short section leading west from Newberry. In March 2010 the city of Trenton was approved for a 2011 state acquisition and development grant for the Trenton Depot. In June 2010 Florida's governor and cabinet approved the state's purchase of a 9.33-mile corridor from Trenton Depot almost to Newberry for the Trenton-Newberry Rail Trail project.

References

External links

 Painting of Old Trenton train station
 Jeff M. Hardison, A Tale of Two Train Stations

Atlantic Coast Line Railroad stations
Transportation buildings and structures in Gilchrist County, Florida
Former railway stations in Florida
Railway stations in the United States opened in 1905